Isaac Wulfovich Beilin (died March 9, 1897) was an Imperial Russian teacher and physician.

Biography
Beilin graduated from the Rabbinical School of Vilna, and subsequently held the position of senior teacher there for seventeen years, until the school was closed by order of the government. He contributed some valuable articles on the Jewish question to the Yevreiskaya Biblioteka and to Razsvyet.

He died in Vilna on March 9, 1897.

References
 

19th-century births
1897 deaths
19th-century educators from the Russian Empire
19th-century physicians from the Russian Empire
Jewish educators
Jewish physicists
Jewish writers from the Russian Empire
Jews from the Russian Empire
Male writers from the Russian Empire
Military doctors of the Russian Empire
Physicians from Vilnius
Writers from Vilnius